Aeolochroma quadrilinea is a moth of the family Geometridae first described by Thomas Pennington Lucas in 1892. It is found in Queensland, Australia.

References

Moths described in 1892
Pseudoterpnini
Moths of Australia